The Corporation Bridge  is a Scherzer rolling lift bascule bridge over the Old Dock (Alexandra Dock) in Grimsby, North East Lincolnshire, England. Built in 1925, it replaced an earlier swing bridge dating to 1872.

1872 bridge
The Great Grimsby Improvement Act of 1869 allowed the land west of the old dock to be developed, and a bridge built across the dock.

The  bridge was constructed by Head Wrightson and the Teesdale Ironworks to the design of Charles Sacre.

The bridge opened in 1872

1925 bridge

The bridge spans Alexandra Dock near Victoria Mills, Victoria Street and replaced a swing bridge.

The bridge is an electrically powered road bridge built on the Scherzer rolling lift bridge  principle road bridge, built in 1925 to the design of Alfred C. Gardner, docks engineer of the London and North Eastern Railway. The contractors were Sir William Arrol & Co. It was formally opened by the Prince of Wales (Edward VIII), commemorated on a plaque on the bridge.

The bridge was restored by Great Grimsby Borough Council c. 1980.

Operation
Although the old dock is now virtually inactive of shipping, the bridge is covered by an act of parliament requiring it to be lifted upon certain requests. Requests were made in the 1990s to allow the historical Ross Tiger and Lincoln Castle vessels to enter the old dock and be permanently berthed to serve as museum pieces and restaurants respectively.

The bridge is still occasionally lifted for testing purposes, most recently being done so in May 2016. In 2017, after weeks of repair work, engineers were not able to carry out a test lift of the bridge.

References

External links

Bridges in Lincolnshire
Buildings and structures in Grimsby
Bridges completed in 1872
Swing bridges in England
Bridges completed in 1925
Bascule bridges
Port of Grimsby